The Men's 200m freestyle event at the 2010 South American Games was held on March 26, with the heats at 11:21 and the Final at 18:59.

Medalists

Records

Results

Heats

Final

References
Heats
Final

Free 200m M